Friends from College is an American comedy television series created by Francesca Delbanco and Nicholas Stoller. The series was greenlit for Netflix as an original on March 11, 2016. The first season consists of eight half-hour episodes, and premiered on Netflix on July 14, 2017. On August 21, 2017, Netflix renewed the series for a second season of eight episodes, which was released on January 11, 2019. The series was canceled on February 18, 2019.

Plot
The series irreverently depicts the tragicomic misadventures of a close-knit group of Harvard alumni in their 40s as they navigate their ambitious yet clumsy and romantically intertwined lives in New York City.

Cast and characters

Main
Keegan-Michael Key as Ethan Turner, Lisa's husband, a respected but financially struggling writer
Cobie Smulders as Lisa Turner aka “Froshy”, a hedge fund lawyer
Annie Parisse as Samantha "Sam" Delmonico, a Manhattan interior designer with whom Ethan has been having an on-and-off affair since college
Nat Faxon as Nick Ames, an unemployed, aging party boy with a trust fund
Fred Savage as Max Adler, a gay literary agent
Jae Suh Park as Marianne, a hippie yoga instructor and an unemployed actress

Recurring
Billy Eichner as Dr. Felix Forzenheim, Max's fiancé
Greg Germann as Jon Spurling, Sam's wealthy husband
 Sarah Chalke as Merrill Morgan (season 2), a former Harvard classmate who begins dating Nick
 Zack Robidas as Charlie (season 2), Lisa's new boyfriend

Guest
Ike Barinholtz as Degrasso, an obnoxious coworker at Lisa's hedge fund
Billy Magnussen as Sean, Shawna's attractive kept man
Kate McKinnon as Shawna, an eccentric YA author
Seth Rogen as Paul "Party Dog" Dobkin, college classmate of the group, Sam's ex-boyfriend and Ethan's rival/frenemy during their college days
Chris Elliott as the Mentalist

Episodes

Season 1 (2017)

Season 2 (2019)

Reception

On Rotten Tomatoes, the series has an approval rating of 24% based on 62 reviews, with an average rating of 4.78/10. The site's critical consensus reads, "Even a cast of talented comedic actors can't keep Friends from College from being anything but underwhelming." On Metacritic, the series has a score of 44 out of 100, based on 31 critics, indicating "mixed or average reviews".

Jeff Jensen of Entertainment Weekly gave the first season a C− rating, writing that the series wastes the talents of its cast members. Tim Dowling of The Guardian writes, "Each character may be unpleasant in his or her own right, but the sheer charmlessness of the group is hard to overstate. If they were sitting at a table near you, you'd leave the restaurant."

References

External links
Friends from College on Netflix

2010s American LGBT-related comedy television series
2010s American college television series
2017 American television series debuts
2019 American television series endings
English-language Netflix original programming
Television shows filmed in New York (state)
Television shows set in New York City